Marrara Oval, currently branded TIO Stadium under a naming rights agreement (and previously also known as Football Park), is a sports ground in Darwin, the capital of Australia's Northern Territory. The ground primarily hosts Australian rules football, cricket, and rugby league.

Marrara Oval was opened in 1991. It has a capacity of 12,500 people, making it the largest stadium in the Northern Territory. However, the ground has a record attendance of 17,500, set in 2003 for a football game featuring the Indigenous All-Stars. Marrara Oval has hosted at least one Australian Football League (AFL) game in every season since 2004 and at least one National Rugby League (NRL) game in every season since 2012. The ground has also hosted both Test and One Day International (ODI) cricket fixtures, most recently in 2008.

History

Australian rules football
Marrara Oval was officially opened to the public on 30 June 1991 as the new home of the Northern Territory Football League (NTFL), and was conservatively estimated as costing $8 million. The first game played under lights at Marrara was a match between Nightcliff and Southern Districts on 9 December 1994. Transport and Works Minister Daryl Manzie officially handed over the lights to the NTFL that day. Installing the lights cost $1.2 million. The light towers were constructed by Darwin firm Norbuilt.

Further preseason fixtures were hosted at the ground over the next decade, including several Indigenous All-Stars games. A 2003 match between the Indigenous All-Stars and Carlton attracted a crowd of 17,500 people, setting a new ground record. The first regular-season AFL match played at Marrara Oval came in round 20 of the 2004 season, when the  hosted .

Between 2004 and 2008 a single Western Bulldogs "home" game was played at the ground each season. In 2010,  also began to play an annual "home" fixture in Darwin. Port Adelaide also had a three-year deal with the Northern Territory government and Marrara Oval, in which they would be the "away" team for games at TIO Stadium each year between 2009 and 2012. Since 2014, only one AFL game has been played at Marrara Oval each year. From 2020,  will play one home game a year at Marrara Oval, replacing Melbourne.

Marrara Oval has been a secondary home ground of the Adelaide Crows women's team since 2017. In April 2016, the Adelaide Crows launched a successful bid to enter a team in the inaugural AFL Women's season. The bid was constructed in partnership with AFLNT, with the club to share resources and facilities between its Adelaide base and AFLNT's Darwin location. It included a commitment to host some home games in Darwin.

AFL records

 Highest team score:
 Largest winning margin:
 Lowest team score:
 4.10 (34) on two occasions:
 Most goals kicked:
 17 – Brad Johnson

 Most goals in a game:
 5 on five occasions
 Most disposals in a game:

Cricket
Marrara Oval has hosted top-level international cricket on several occasions. In July 2003, the ground hosted the first Test of a series between Australia and Bangladesh. A One Day International (ODI) game between the same teams was played the following month. In July 2004, a second Test was played, the first of a series between Australia and Sri Lanka. After that, top-level international cricket did not return to Marrara Oval until mid-2008, when the ground hosted a three-ODI series between Australia and Bangladesh.

International centuries
Two Test and One ODI centuries have been scored at the venue.

Tests

ODIs

International five-wicket hauls
Four Test five-wicket hauls have been taken at the venue.

Rugby league

In the National Rugby League (NRL), the Sydney Roosters played host against the North Queensland Cowboys in Round 7 of the 2012 NRL season in front of 10,008 fans. This was the first time Darwin hosted a professional Rugby League game since 1995. The second game at Marrara came in Round 17 of the 2013 NRL season when the Penrith Panthers (who had previously played games in Darwin during the 1990s) defeated the Gold Coast Titans 40–18 in front of 8,050 for what was a Titans home game.

In 2014, the Parramatta Eels, a Sydney-based National Rugby League (NRL) club, announced they would be playing four games at Marrara over the following four years. The first game came on 9 August (Round 22) during the 2014 NRL season when the Eels defeated the Canberra Raiders 18–10 in front of 9,527 fans.

In 2017 Marrara Oval hosted a quarter-final of the 2017 Rugby League World Cup between Australia and Samoa, Australia winning 46–0. It drew a crowd of 13,473, which is the highest rugby league crowd the stadium has ever gotten and the fourth highest overall.

Other events
TIO Stadium has hosted AC/DC for their "Ballbreaker" tour in November 1996, when 13,000 fans and 170 tonnes of equipment packed the ground.
Sir Elton John performed for the first time in the Northern Territory, at TIO Stadium on 17 May 2008 as part of his Australian Tour.

Attendance records

Last updated on 24 April 2021

See also
List of Test cricket grounds

References

External links

Australian Football League grounds
Test cricket grounds in Australia
Tourist attractions in Darwin, Northern Territory
Sports venues in Darwin, Northern Territory
1991 establishments in Australia
Sports venues completed in 1991
Rugby league stadiums in Australia
North East Australian Football League grounds
AFL Women's grounds